Sing the Word Hope in Four-Part Harmony is the second album by the British instrumental rock band Maybeshewill, released in June 2009.

Track listing

References

External links
 

2009 albums
Maybeshewill albums